The 2018–19 season was AS Monaco FC's sixth consecutive season in Ligue 1 since promotion from Ligue 2 in 2013. They participated in the Coupe de France, the Coupe de la Ligue, the Trophée des Champions and the UEFA Champions League.

Season events
On 11 October, AS Monaco announced that they had parted ways with manager Leonardo Jardim. Two days later, 13 October, AS Monaco announced the appointment of Thierry Henry as their new head coach on a contract until June 2021. On 24 January, AS Monaco announced that they had suspended Thierry Henry and that Franck Passi would be leading the team while they made their decision on Henry's future. The following day, AS Monaco announced Henrys permanent departure and the re-appointment of Leonardo Jardim as manager.

Transfers

Summer
On 8 June, AS Monaco announced that Terence Kongolo would be joining Huddersfield Town on a permanent basis when the transfer window opened on 1 July. The following day, 9 June, Samuel Grandsir signed for AS Monaco from Troyes on a five-year contract to begin 1 July 2018.

On 13 June, goalkeeper Paul Nardi joined Cercle Brugge on a season-long loan deal, with Pierre-Daniel N'Guinda, Yoann Etienne and Kevin Appin all joining Cercle Brugge on loan for the 2018–19 season on 16 June. Four days later, on 20 June, Guévin Tormin also joined Cercle Brugge on a season-long loan deal.

On 19 June, Willem Geubbels joined Monaco from Lyon.

On 23 June, Gil Dias joined Nottingham Forest on loan for the 2018–19 season.

On 27 June, Monaco announced the departure of Mehdi Beneddine to Quevilly-Rouen.

On 28 June, Tiago Ribeiro joined Monaco's Academy squad from Porto, while Franck Irie joined Cercle Brugge on a season-long loan deal. The following day, on 29 June, Sofiane Diop and Isidor Wilson joined Monaco from Rennes.

On 2 July, Robert Navarro joined Monaco from Barcelona.

On 4 July, Irvin Cardona re-joined Cercle Brugge on loan for the 2018–19 season.

On 6 July, Monaco announced the signing of Jonathan Panzo from Chelsea, and Pelé on a five-year contract from Rio Ave.

On 9 July, AS Monaco announced the signing of Ronaël Pierre-Gabriel on a five-year contract from Saint-Étienne.

On 10 July, AS Monaco announced the signing of Antonio Barreca on a five-year contract from Torino, with Soualiho Meïté going in the opposite direction.

On 20 July, striker Adama Diakhaby followed Terence Kongolo in signing for Huddersfield Town for an undisclosed fee.

On 24 July, Monaco signed Jean-Eudes Aholou from Strasbourg on a five-year contract, while João Moutinho moved to Wolverhampton Wanderers and Adrien Bongiovanni joined Cercle Brugge on loan for the season.

On 27 July, Monaco announced the signing of Aleksandr Golovin to a five-year contract for an undisclosed fee from CSKA Moscow. Three days later, on 30 July, Monaco confirmed that Thomas Lemar had left the club to sign for Atlético Madrid.

On 5 August, Monaco announced that Rachid Ghezzal had joined Leicester City,
with Nabil Alioui joining Cercle Brugge on loan the next day.

Two days later, on 7 August, Boschilia extended his Monaco contract until the summer of 2021, then joined Nantes on a season-long loan deal, while Álvaro Llorente moved to Extremadura on a season-long loan. On 8 August, Jonathan Mexique joined Cholet on a season-long loan deal.

On 13 August, young midfielder Ibrahima Diallo joined Brest on a season-long loan deal, while Keita Baldé joined Inter Milan on a season-long loan deal with an option to make the move permanent.

On 22 August, Dinis Almeida joined Xanthi on a season-long loan deal.

On 28 August, Benjamin Henrichs joined AS Monaco on a five-year contract from Bayer Leverkusen.

On 30 August, Nacer Chadli signed a three-year contract with AS Monaco from West Bromwich Albion, Jorge joined Porto on a season-long loan deal and Lacina Traoré had his contract terminated by mutual consent. The following day, Elderson Echiéjilé also left AS Monaco after his contract was also terminated by mutual consent.

Winter
On 2 January, AS Monaco announced their first signing of the winter transfer window, with Lyle Foster arriving from Orlando Pirates to sign until June 2023. The following day, 3 January, AS Monaco announced the signing of Naldo on an 18-month contract, after his Schalke 04 ended.
On 10 January, Fodé Ballo-Touré signed from Lille on a contract until June 2023. The following day, 11 January, Cesc Fàbregas signed for AS Monaco on a contract until June 2022, and William Vainqueur joined on loan from Antalyaspor on 12 January.
On 20 January, Samuel Grandsir was sent on loan to Strasbourg for the remainder of the 2018–19 season. On 24 January, AS Monaco and Nottingham Forest agreed to cancel Gil Dias's loan deal, allowing Dias to sign for Olympiacos on loan until 30 June 2020.

On 27 January, AS Monaco announced the arrival of Gelson Martins on loan from Atlético Madrid until the end of the season.
On 30 January, AS Monaco announced the signing of Carlos Vinícius on loan until the end of the season.

On 31 January, transfer deadline day, Georges-Kévin Nkoudou joined from Tottenham Hotspur on loan until the end of the season, whilst Youssef Aït Bennasser, Pelé. Antonio Barreca, Almamy Touré, Adama Traoré and Loïc Badiashile all left on loan for the remainder of the season, joining Saint-Étienne, Nottingham Forest, Newcastle United, Eintracht Frankfurt, Cercle Brugge and Rennes, respectively.

Also on transfer deadline day, Adrien Silva joined on loan from Leicester City for the remainder of the season, with Youri Tielemans going the opposite way on loan for the rest of the season.

Contract extensions
On 11 July, Julien Serrano extended his contract with AS Monaco until the summer of 2022.

On 18 July, Kévin N'Doram extended his contract with AS Monaco until the summer of 2023.

Squad

Out on loan

Reserves

Transfers

In

 Transfers arranged on the above dates, but were not finalised until 1 July.

Out

 Transfers arranged on the above dates, but were not finalized until 1 July.

Loans in

Loans out

Released

Friendlies

Competitions

Overview

Trophée des Champions

Ligue 1

League table

Results summary

Results by round

Results

Coupe de France

Coupe de la Ligue

UEFA Champions League

Group stage

Statistics

Appearances and goals

|-
|colspan="14"|Players away from the club on loan:

|-
|colspan="14"|Players who appeared for Monaco no longer at the club:
|}

Goalscorers

Disciplinary record

|-
|colspan="23"|Players away on loan:

References

External links

AS Monaco FC seasons
Monaco
Monaco
AS Monaco
AS Monaco